Vanessa Getty (born 1972) is an American model and philanthropist.

Life and career
Getty was born in San Francisco to Claude Jarman Jr., an actor, and Maryann Opperman, a ballerina. She is a graduate of University of California, Los Angeles.

In 1999, she married Billy Getty, a son of Gordon Getty and Ann Getty, in the Napa Valley. The couple have three children and are based in San Francisco.

In 2015, she was named as an honorary co-chair of the Fine Arts Museum of San Francisco.

As a philanthropist, she has contributed in development of the Peninsula Humane Society. Getty is also the founder of San Francisco Bay Humane Friends.

Democratic party fundraising
She supported and funded the campaign of U.S. Vice President Kamala Harris.

References

Living people
1972 births
University of California, Los Angeles alumni
American socialites
American models
American philanthropists
Vanessa